Chonlanan Srikaew (born June 4, 1961), is a Thai physician and politician who currently served as the Opposition Leader in the House of Representatives of Thailand since 23 December 2021. He is a leader of the Pheu Thai Party since 28 October 2021.

Early life
Chonlanan was born on June 4, 1961, at Lai Nan Subdistrict, Wiang Sa District, Nan Province. He graduated with a bachelor's degree in medicine from the Faculty of Medicine Siriraj Hospital Mahidol University in 1986 and a master's degree in Public Administration from the National Institute of Development Administration in 1999.

Chonlanan was a physician at Wiang Sa Hospital, Wiang Sa District, Nan Province, and used to be the Director of Somdej Phra Yuparat Pua Hospital, Pua District, Nan Province between 1995 to 2000.

Political career
Chonlanan was elected a member of the House of Representatives for the first time in 2001 under the Thai Rak Thai Party and currently serves as a member of the House of Representatives for the Nan Province under the Pheu Thai Party. In 2004, he was appointed as the Assistant Secretary to the Minister of Public Health and in 2005 as the Secretary to the Minister of Public Health under the Thaksin Shinawatra premiership. Under Yingluck Shinawatra's government, Srikaew was appointed Deputy Minister of Public Health on October 27, 2012, until June 2013. On October 28, 2021, he was elected leader of the Pheu Thai Party and on December 23, 2021, was appointed as Leader of the Opposition in the House of Representatives.

Royal decorations
2008 -  Knight Grand Cordon (Special Class) of the Most Exalted Order of the White Elephant
2005 -  Knight Grand Cordon (Special Class) of the Most Noble Order of the Crown of Thailand
2002 -  Bitaksa Seri Chon - Freemen Safeguarding Medal (Second Class, Second Category)

References

Chonlanan Srikaew
Chonlanan Srikaew
Chonlanan Srikaew
Chonlanan Srikaew
1961 births
Living people